James S. Martin may refer to:

James Stewart Martin (congressman) (1826–1907), U.S. Representative from Illinois
James Stewart Martin (author), Germany
James S. Martin (evangelical minister), anti-Mormon preacher
James Slattin Martin Jr. (1920–2002), project manager for the Viking program

See also
James Martin (disambiguation)